Clermont is a  farm and national historic district located near Berryville, Clarke County, Virginia. The main house was created by Edward Snickers in five parts, beginning in 1756, with additions circa 1770, 1810 and 1840, with a final addition in 1970. The house has an unusual plan with a stair perpendicular to the central hall.

The original land grant was made from Thomas Fairfax, 6th Lord Fairfax of Cameron to John Vance in 1751. Vance, born in 1699, was from County Tyrone in Ireland, sailing to America in 1731. In 1753 he sold the property to Thomas Wadlington, who in turn sold to Edward Snickers, who ran a tavern and a ferry on the Shenandoah River near Williams Gap, later called Snickers Gap. His son William inherited the property in 1791. In 1819 William Snickers sold Clermont to Dawson McCormick, whose son Edward inherited the property in 1834.

References

Federal architecture in Virginia
Houses completed in 1770
Georgian architecture in Virginia
Houses on the National Register of Historic Places in Virginia
Houses in Clarke County, Virginia
National Register of Historic Places in Clarke County, Virginia
Historic districts on the National Register of Historic Places in Virginia
1770 establishments in Virginia